John Trevelyan may refer to:

Sir John Trevelyan, 2nd Baronet (1670–1755), British MP
Sir John Trevelyan, 4th Baronet (1735–1828), British MP
Sir John Trevelyan, 5th Baronet (1761–1846)
John Trevelyan (censor) (1903–1986), Secretary of the Board of the British Board of Film Censors
John Trevelyan (chess player) (born 1948), Welsh chess player

See also
Trevelyan (disambiguation)